Crambus pascuella is a species of moth of the family Crambidae. It is found in Europe and Asia Minor.

The wingspan is 20–24 mm. The forewings with apex triangularly produced; brownish - ochreous, posteriorly with whitish blackish - edged interneural streaks; a white dorsal streak; a broad shining white median longitudinal streak, reaching costa towards base, narrowed posteriorly, where it is cut by an oblique dark line, not passing second line; second line angulated, silvery-white, dark-edged anteriorly, preceded by a white costal spot and followed by a V - shaped mark;some black terminal longitudinal marks; cilia metallic. Hindwings are grey, more whitish dorsally.
 
The moth flies from May to September depending on the location.

The larvae feed on various grasses, especially Poa species.

References

External links
 
 Microlepidoptera.nl 
 waarneming.nl 
 Lepidoptera of Belgium
 Crambus pascuella at UKmoths

Crambini
Moths described in 1758
Moths of Europe
Insects of Iceland
Taxa named by Carl Linnaeus